Hanna Lake is a lake in Urak Valley near Quetta, in Balochistan Province, in southwestern Pakistan. It is surrounded by mountains.

Geography
The reservoir was constructed in 1894 during the British Colonial era on the land of local tribesmen, and is one of the main attractions in the city. It forms a great historical bridge wall between two mountains, the depths like battlements of a fort, for the storing of water.

Features
Hanna Lake is one of the most visited and accessible lakes in Balochistan. There is a lakeside restaurant with picnic tables shaded by pine trees at the end of the river, where families can enjoy the food and weather. On the eastern side of the lake stands the Hayat Durrani Water Sports Academy (HDWSA), the first and only rowing, canoeing, kayaking and sailing training and championships organising centre in Balochistan Province, with provision of rough swimming facility.

History

In 1894, the small action dam Surrpull (Red Bridge) was constructed on the main Urak road to control flooding, and divert water, coming catastrophically from snow melt and rain down the Zarghoon Ghar and Murddar Mountains Koh-i-Murdaar streams, into Hanna Lake through its main canal.

Over a century old in 1908, this lake was spread over an area of 818 acres with a holding capacity of over 220 million gallons of water and a depth of .In 1973 a heavy flood destroyed the Murdar Mountains recharge linked canal on the way to Surrpull, near Spin Kaarrez road, which has not been (Restored) reconstructed till date.

Presently, in May 2016 a heavy flood filled this small action dam Surrpull with mud and stones. Accordingly, all the streams and flood waters are going waste and there is no chance to regulate water conservancy to Hanna Lake without the restoration, desilting of surrpull and both main canals. On the other hand, the water level in Hanna Lake is falling critically low, hence endangering the natural ecosystem, the local wild life, the environment of the surroundings, and native peoples, along with hundreds of migrated birds and thousands of fish. The future of athletic activities such as rowing and canoeing is also in danger. It is possible that the Hanna Lake might be fully dried, like in 1999 to January 2005, and in 2010.

The environmental scientists, Speleologists and the Conservationists are looking at the future of the lake in its most dangerous condition. The current harmful environmental situation will badly affect the natural eco system, environment, and underground water level of the surroundings. However, the small action dam surpull was locally restored / desilted in February 2019, with the assistance of Hashim Khan Ghalzai, secretary P&D, and Hayatullah Khan Durrani C.E, HDWSA. Since then the flood rain from the Zarghoon mountains has been continuously coming to Hanna Lake, and the water level has risen by up to 50%.

Establishment of (HDWSA)

On 22 July 1986, Haji Khair Muhammad Khan Kakar Son of Sarfaraz Khan Kakar gifted 2 Acre (8093.71 square meter) of land on the North West edge of Hanna Lake to Hayatullah Khan Durrani known for caving and Mountaineering Adventure sports in Balochistan.
Hayatullah Khan Durrani established Hayat Durrani Water Sports Academy (HDWSA) on the eve of 14 August 1986 Pakistan Independence-Day the Balochistan's first and only Rowing, Canoeing, Kayaking, Sailing, rough swimming and boating academy where all such facilities regarding Rowing, Canoeing, Kayaking, Sailing, rough swimming training, events equipment's and boating provides voluntary free of cost to the youth members at Hanna Lake.

1990 Hanna Lake boat disaster
On 6 July 1990, 40 people were killed and 8 injured when an overcrowded local tourists boat capsized in Hanna Lake. Most of the victims were on holiday. Another boat was used to rescue the victims.

Present day
This channel nowadays needs repairs and is wasting water and recently the Hanna Lake has been fully dried since August 2016 causing killing of thousands of fish and the future of the canoe Kayak and rowing National and International level is turning in to dark now. There is also a water channel which was constructed at the same time by the British to convert the snow and rain water near Spin Kaarez, coming from Murdar Mount, as surplus for filling the water in this lake. The channel was destroyed by a heavy flood in 1976 and has still not been re-constructed. The loss of the snow and rain water was wasted causing Hanna Lake to fully dry up between 1999 and January 2005. The government of Balochistan did nothing for the restoration of water level at Hanna lake on the other-hand the HDWSA officials and some officials of Hanna Lake Development Authority (HLDA) the custodians of Hanna Lake had full efforts for the restoration of water through the surplus canal to main Hanna Lake.

Dry lake

From years 2000–2010 Hanna Lake dried up and the natives along with hundreds of migrated birds were in trouble.

Full lake

However, in 2011 the lake re-filled and once again gave rise to flora and fauna in its environment. The turquoise waters of the lake provide a rich contrast to the sandy brown of the hills in the background. One can promenade on the terraces or hire a boat and paddle on the lake and round the island in the middle.

See also
Hanna-Urak Waterfall
Quetta
Urak Valley

References

External links

 Quetta-city.blogspot: Hanna Lake
Flickr: Hanna Lake and Mountains

Lakes of Balochistan (Pakistan)
Quetta District